The Bonefro-Santa Croce railway station is the railway stop that serves the municipalities of Bonefro and Santa Croce di Magliano, is in the Bonefro territory.

After the 2002 Molise earthquake the station was demolished and replaced with a covered shelter and remained only one track.

References
This article is based upon a translation of the Italian language version as of May 2017.

Bibliography

External links

Railway stations in Molise
Railway lines opened in 1883